Mandamento may refer to:

 Mandamento (administrative district)
 Mandamento (Sicilian Mafia)

See also
 Capomandamento